Johne is both a surname and a given name. Notable people with the name include:

Surname
 Heinrich Albert Johne (1839–1910), German pathologist
 Nick Johne (born 1955), Canadian actor
 Karol de Johne (1890–1949), Polish literary critic 

Given name
 Johne Murphy (born 1984), Irish rugby player
 Johne Rotz, 16th-century French artist-cartographer
 Johne Binkley (born 1953), politician in Alaska, USA